José Rogério de Oliveira (born 24 December 1990), known as Rogério, is a Brazilian professional footballer who plays as a forward or winger for Bahia.

Honours
Náutico
Copa Pernambuco: 2011

Sport Recife
Campeonato Pernambucano: 2017

Bahia
Campeonato Baiano: 2019

References

External links

1990 births
Living people
Brazilian footballers
Association football wingers
Association football forwards
Campeonato Brasileiro Série A players
Campeonato Brasileiro Série B players
Campeonato Brasileiro Série D players
Clube Atlético do Porto players
Central Sport Club players
Clube Náutico Capibaribe players
Botafogo de Futebol e Regatas players
Esporte Clube Vitória players
São Paulo FC players
Sport Club do Recife players
Esporte Clube Bahia players
UAE Pro League players
Al Dhafra FC players
Brazilian expatriate footballers
Brazilian expatriate sportspeople in the United Arab Emirates
Expatriate footballers in the United Arab Emirates